Minotti is an Italian surname. Notable people with the surname include:

Lorenzo Minotti (born 1967), Italian footballer
Nadir Minotti (born 1992), Italian footballer
Christian Minotti, Italian long-distance swimmer
Felice Minotti, (1887–1963), Italian actor

Italian-language surnames